Hogget may refer to:
 A domestic sheep between one and two years of age
 The meat from such an animal — see lamb and mutton 
 The wool of such an animal

See also
 Hoggett, a surname (with list of people with this name)